Pierre Jalbert (9 January 1925 – 22 January 2014) was a Canadian skier, actor, and motion picture film and sound editor, primarily known for his role as "Caje" on the US television 1960s World War II program Combat!.

Early life

He was Christened Joseph Jacques Pierre-Paul Jalbert in Quebec City, Quebec, the son of a newspaperman. He graduated from Ouellet College and attended Laval University, where he was part of the University Royal Canadian Air Cadets during World War II.

Skiing career
He was both Canada's Junior and Senior National Ski Champion.  In 1948, he was the Captain of Canada's Olympic Ski Team at St. Moritz, but due to breaking his leg in a fall during a practice run, he never skied in the Games.  After the Olympics, he was involved with the National Film Board of Canada.  Eventually he moved to the United States and worked as a ski instructor at Sun Valley, Idaho, in the 1950s.

Editing and acting career
In 1952, he went to Hollywood looking for a job, and found employment as a film editor at MGM.

In 1961, at the urging of an agent friend, he auditioned for and got the part of bilingual Cajun PFC Paul "Caje" Le May in the ABC World War II dramatic TV series Combat!.  After the show's cancellation in 1967, Jalbert had a few other acting roles before returning to his editing career.  Pierre worked on The Godfather, including the famous baptism intercut sequence at the climax of the movie. He was nominated for an Emmy Award for sound editing for the 1981 miniseries Shōgun. He retired in 1990.

Personal information
He is the brother of René Marc Jalbert, the sergeant-at-arms of Quebec's legislature whose bravery saved lives during Denis Lortie's 1984 attack on that institution. He was married to Joy Lee, a ballerina and interior designer who appeared in the films Son of Sinbad and Love is a Many-Splendored Thing.

Death

Pierre Jalbert died in Los Angeles on 22 January 2014. He had been in the hospital since suffering a heart attack on his 89th birthday, two weeks prior.

Filmography (actor)

References

External links

1925 births
2014 deaths
Canadian male film actors
Canadian male television actors
Canadian military personnel of World War II
Male actors from Quebec City
20th-century Canadian male actors
Université Laval alumni